Kyneton High School is a secondary school in Kyneton, Victoria, Australia, approximately 90 km north of Melbourne.  It was built in 1912, and opened in 1928 under the name of Kyneton High School.

External links

Kyneton High School

Educational institutions established in 1928
Secondary schools in Victoria (Australia)
Kyneton, Victoria
1928 establishments in Australia